Rayland Baxter (stylized as rayLand baxter) is an American alternative country musician from Nashville, Tennessee. He is currently signed to ATO Records. Baxter is the son of musician Bucky Baxter. He is 6-feet 5-inches tall.

Early life
Baxter excelled as a lacrosse player in high school as a midfielder. He attended the Severn School in Maryland and later Suffield Academy in Connecticut. He played Division I Lacrosse at Loyola University in Maryland before a knee injury ended his playing career. He was expelled from Loyola his sophomore year for getting in a fight on campus. In Baltimore, Baxter worked as a bartender at Jerry's Belvedere before moving to Colorado to work as a snowboard instructor in Breckenridge. There he began playing open mics at Gold Pan Saloon, starting his music career before eventually moving back to his hometown of Nashville to pursue music full time.

Career
Baxter began performing in 2010, when he was featured on the song Shanghai Cigarettes by country musician Caitlin Rose. In 2012, Baxter released his debut full-length album, titled Feathers & Fishhooks (stylized as feathers & fishHooks), via ATO Records. In 2013, Baxter released his first extended play, titled Ashkelon (stylized as ashkeLON) also via ATO Records. The title is named after the town Ashkelon in Israel. On August 14, 2015, Baxter released his second studio album titled Imaginary Man. In 2018, Baxter released his third full-length album titled Wide Awake. In 2019, Baxter released Good Mmornin, an album of seven Mac Miller cover songs. The record was released the day before he played the Newport Folk Fest where he debuted several of the songs live for the first time.

References

Living people
American country singer-songwriters
People from Nashville, Tennessee
Year of birth missing (living people)
Singer-songwriters from Tennessee
21st-century American singers
Country musicians from Tennessee
ATO Records artists